Labdia ilarcha is a moth in the family Cosmopterigidae. It was described by Edward Meyrick in 1911. It is known from the Seychelles in the Indian Ocean.

References

Labdia
Moths described in 1911